David Peter Tower Deshon (19 June 1923 – 18 January 1992) was a successful school cricketer whose later progress in first-class cricket was limited by his career as a full-time officer in the Royal Artillery. He was born at Marylebone, London and died suddenly of a heart attack at Heathrow Airport.

Cricket career
Deshon was a successful schoolboy cricketer at Sherborne School and was selected for the annual Marylebone Cricket Club (MCC) schools cricket festival in 1941, where he scored a century and outshone Trevor Bailey in a big partnership. He was a middle-order right-handed batsman.

As an officer in the regular army, his first-class cricket was very restricted. He made four appearances for Somerset, three of them in 1947 and a final one in 1953. His final match was Bertie Buse's infamous benefit match at Bath against Lancashire in 1953, when the entire match was completed in a single day; Deshon's contributions to the debacle were innings of 0 and 9. In all, he scored 82 first-class runs at an average of 11.71, with a highest score of 21. He appeared in non-first-class inter-services cricket, as well as playing for the Royal Artillery.

Military career
On leaving school, Deshon was commissioned as a second lieutenant in the Royal Artillery on 24 October 1942. After the Second World War ended, he remained within the Army and was promoted to Lieutenant (1946), Captain (1950) and Major (1957). He retired from the Royal Artillery  with the rank of major in 1958.

References

1923 births
1992 deaths
English cricketers
Somerset cricketers
People educated at Sherborne School
Royal Artillery officers
British Army personnel of World War II